Merica melanostoma is a species of sea snail, a marine gastropod mollusk in the family Cancellariidae, the nutmeg snails.

Subspecies
 Merica melanostoma melanostoma  (Sowerby, G.B. II, 1849)
 Merica melanostoma westralis (Garrard, T.A., 1975)

Description
The shell is whitish-orange and cream. Its size varies between 14mm and 38 mm, ending in a pointed apex. The shells are more globular than the rest of the genus, accented with rounded shoulders and deep sutures. The surface is covered with fine nodules.

Distribution
This species is distributed in the Red Sea, Western Indian Ocean, the Gulf of Oman, Western Australia and Northern Australia

References

Cancellariidae
Gastropods described in 1849